Marsalforn Bay is a bay located in Marsalforn, Gozo.

References 

Żebbuġ, Gozo
Bays of Malta